The Independent Review of the Fire Service, sometimes referred to as the Bain Report or IRFS was a wide-ranging report carried out by Professor Sir George Bain, in 2002, at the request of the government, into the how Fire and Rescue Services were operated and managed; and about the working conditions of firefighters in the UK. When the report was completed, its full title was The Future of the Fire Service: reducing risk, saving lives - The Independent Review of the Fire Service  
, although it is generally known by the shortened name (including the online version). On publication, its authors said the report: "sets out our recommendations for how the service should change in the future to meet the demands of the twenty-first century." The report prompted a prolonged period of industrial action in the UK by firefighters, the first national strike since 1977.  The Bain report made several recommendations, that led to wide ranging changes in the approach to fire and rescue authorities (FRS) in the UK.  It was controversial because of its extensive scope, and in 2006, many changes to UK FRS continue as a direct result of it.

Report authors
The review consisted of three members, chaired by Bain.  Their credentials are described below, when the report was published in 2002.  The IRFS took three months to complete, the first firefighter strikes were in November, just before the IRFS was published.

 Professor Sir George Bain, President and Vice-Chancellor, Queen's University Belfast
 Professor Sir Michael Lyons, Director, INLOGOV and Professor of Public Policy, University of Birmingham. In 2007 he was appointed as chair of the BBC Trust
 Sir Anthony Young, Trade Union Liaison Officer, Ethical Trading Initiative; and lately President of the Trades Union Congress

Scope of the IRFS

 The role of the fire service today
 The future role of the fire service
 Risk and community fire safety
 Role of central and local government
 Implementation and management policy
 Pay, pensions, conditions of service
 Retained firefighters
 Implementing reform

Implications of the IRFS
The IRFS had the effect of changing firefighters pay and conditions, and created a massive structural change to the fire service in the UK. It prompted a white paper that led to a change in the primary legislation for the operation of FRS.

See also
Fire service in the United Kingdom
UK Firefighter dispute 2002/2003
Operation Fresco
Fire Brigades Union
Chief Fire Officers Association
Fire Service College

References

External links
Independent Review of the Fire Service, at FRSOnline
Independent Review of the Fire Service (cave: as of July 2007, this domain is owned by a domain grabber)
Bain Report Review on Local Government Association
"Agenda to deliver a modern Fire Service" at cheshirefire
Department for Communities and Local Govt: Fire

Fire and rescue in the United Kingdom